The Constitutional Acts, Legislation and General Administration Committee (French: Commission des Lois) (known as the Law Committee) is one of the eight standing committees of the French National Assembly.

Chairs 

 Yaël Braun-Pivet - 15th legislature of the French Fifth Republic

References 

Committees of the National Assembly (France)